The 2004 European Track Championships were the European Championships for track cycling, for junior and under 23 riders. They took place in Valencia, Spain.

Medal summary

Under 23

Junior
Medal table

Medal Table

References

European Track Championships, 2004
European Track Championships